The CSX Transportation Building is a  high-rise office building located in  Jacksonville, Florida. Completed in 1960, the building currently serves as headquarters for CSX Corporation. The building is located in the Northbank area of Downtown Jacksonville, along the banks of the St. Johns River. 

The building was originally built as the headquarters for the Atlantic Coast Line Railroad. In 1956, the railroad company decided to move its corporate headquarters from Wilmington, North Carolina to Jacksonville, which was the winning candidate of three southern cities; the other two were Savannah, Georgia and Charleston, South Carolina. From July 1960 to July 1, 1967, the building was used by the ACL; from July 1, 1967 to January 1, 1983, by the Seaboard Coast Line Railroad (a company created by the merger of the Seaboard Air Line Railroad and the ACL), and from January 1, 1983 to the present by the Seaboard System Railroad, renamed CSX Transportation on July 1, 1986.

Its former names include Atlantic Coast Line Railroad Building, Seaboard Coastline Railroad Building, and Seaboard System Railroad Building. Designed by lead architect Bob Lee of KBJ Architects, the CSX Transportation Building is a LEED certified building and is an example of Mid-century modern and International style architecture.

Gallery

See also
 Architecture of Jacksonville
 List of tallest buildings in Jacksonville
 Downtown Jacksonville

References 

KBJ Architects buildings
Skyscraper office buildings in Jacksonville, Florida
Downtown Jacksonville
Northbank, Jacksonville
CSX Transportation
Jacksonville Modern architecture
Office buildings completed in 1960
1960 establishments in Florida